Carlos Gerardo Rodríguez Serrano (born 16 April 1985) is a Mexican former professional footballer who played as a left-back. He received his first cap in a 1–0 loss to Colombia on 22 August 2007.

International caps 

As of 22 August 2007

Honours
Pachuca
Mexico Championship: Clausura 2006, Clausura 2007
CONCACAF Champions' Cup: 2007, 2008
Copa Sudamericana: 2006
North American SuperLiga: 2007
CONCACAF Champions' League: 2009–10

References

External links

1985 births
Living people
Footballers from Sinaloa
C.F. Pachuca players
Deportivo Toluca F.C. players
C.D. Guadalajara footballers
Atlético Morelia players
Club Puebla players
Liga MX players
Association football midfielders
Mexico international footballers
Sportspeople from Culiacán
Mexican footballers